Raithaliya is a small village in Nagaur district of Rajasthan, India. Raithaliya comes under Asarwa Panchayat.

External links

Rajasthan